Venus No. 17 is an extended play by Squarepusher. The song "Venus No. 17" also appears on Square Window and the Japanese double-CD pressing of Ultravisitor.

Track listing

12" vinyl
Side A
"Venus No.17" - 6:35
"Venus No.17 (Acid Mix)" - 5:33
Side B
"Tundra 4" - 12:40

CD (promo)
"Venus No. 17" - 6:44
"Venus No. 17 (Acid Mix)" - 5:39
"Tundra 4" - 12:40

References
12" vinyl at discogs
CD at discogs

2004 EPs
Squarepusher EPs